Selinus or Selinous was a village in the north of ancient Laconia, described by Pausanias as 20 stadia from Geronthrae; but as Pausanias seems not to have visited this part of Laconia, the distances may not be correct.

Its site is located northwest the modern Geraki.

References

Populated places in ancient Laconia
Former populated places in Greece